Emblemaria piratula (pirate blenny) is a species of chaenopsid blenny found in coral reefs in the western central Atlantic ocean. It can reach a maximum length of  TL. It is also found in the aquarium trade.

References
 Ginsburg, I. 1942 (15 Dec.) Seven new American fishes. Journal of the Washington Academy of Sciences v. 32 (no. 12): 364–370.

piratula
Fauna of the Southeastern United States
Fish of the Gulf of Mexico
Fish described in 1942
Taxa named by Isaac Ginsburg
Taxa named by Earl Desmond Reid